Rhabdiasidae is a family of nematodes belonging to the order Rhabditida.

Genera

Genera:
 Acanthorhabdias Pereira, 1927
 Angiostoma Dujardin, 1845
 Chabirenia Lhermitte-Vallarino, Bain, Deharo, Bertani, Voza, Attout & Gaucher, 2005

References

Nematodes